St. Paul's F.C. is a football club based on the Channel Island of Jersey. They are affiliated to the Jersey Football Association and play in the Jersey Football Combination Premiership.

The club has a rich history of producing Jersey's finest players, with the likes of Graeme Le Saux and Brett Pitman coming through the ranks to become established professional footballers.  In the 2009-10 season, they became the first club to win all six competitions in one season, by winning the league, 4 cups and the Upton (an inter-island cup final between the league champions of Jersey and Guernsey).

In 2015, they created history by winning the Upton 9-0 against Guernsey Northerners, the biggest win in the history of the Upton.

In 2018, two players have represented the England national football C team, Euan Van De Vliet and Harry Curtis.

References

External links

Football clubs in Jersey